Foel y Geifr is a subsidiary summit of Esgeiriau Gwynion, and included in a group of hills known as the Hirnantau. These hills rise from the south east shores of Llyn Tegid. Confusion arises when trying to establish to which mountain range these belong to. Since, Foel y Geifr forms part of the Hirnant horseshoe, many consider it to be a Berwyn peak. However, geographically it belongs to the Aran Fawddwy group, its parent peak being Esgeiriau Gwynion. It is the eastern outpost of the Arans.

The summit is grassy and has a trig point, while the terrain surrounding the summit is heathery and boggy. The summit is the highest in a ridge that forms the western backwall of Cwm Hirnant. Two other summit lie along the ridge: Trum y Gwragedd and the Hewitt Foel Goch (Hirnant). To the south-west lies Moel y Cerrig Duon, to the east lies Pen y Boncyn Trefeilw and Cyrniau Nod.

References

Llangywer
Llanuwchllyn
Mountains and hills of Gwynedd
Mountains and hills of Snowdonia
Hewitts of Wales
Nuttalls